Cooltoon was an Italian television channel dedicated to broadcasting anime programming. Exclusively available on Sky Italia, it was launched in 2007 and closed down in 2011.

Programming
 Captain Harlock
 Daltanius
 Desert Punk
 Fat Albert and the Cosby Kids
 Filmation's Ghostbusters
 Future Boy Conan
 Great Teacher Onizuka
 La Linea
 He-Man
 InuYasha
 Invincible Steel Man Daitarn 3
 Ōgon Bat
 Robotech
 Ranma ½
 Saiyuki
 She-Ra
 Six God Combination Godmars
 Samurai 7
 The New Adventures of Flash Gordon
 Transformers
 Urusei Yatsura

References

Television channels in Italy
Television channels and stations established in 2007
Television channels and stations disestablished in 2011
Italian-language television stations